The 1995 Dwars door België was the 50th edition of the Dwars door Vlaanderen cycle race and was held on 22 March 1995. The race started and finished in Waregem. The race was won by Jelle Nijdam.

General classification

References

1995
1995 in road cycling
1995 in Belgian sport
March 1995 sports events in Europe